GlcA-beta-(1->2)-D-Man-alpha-(1->3)-D-Glc-beta-(1->4)-D-Glc-alpha-1-diphospho-ditrans,octacis-undecaprenol 4-beta-mannosyltransferase (GumI) is an enzyme with systematic name GDP-mannose:GlcA-beta-(1->2)-D-Man-alpha-(1->3)-D-Glc-beta-(1->4)-D-Glc-alpha-1-diphospho-ditrans,octacis-undecaprenol 4-beta-mannosyltransferase. This enzyme catalyses the following chemical reaction

 GDP-mannose + GlcA-beta-(1->2)-D-Man-alpha-(1->3)-D-Glc-beta-(1->4)-D-Glc-alpha-1-diphospho-ditrans,octacis-undecaprenol  GDP + D-Man-beta-(1->4)- GlcA-beta-(1->2)-D-Man-alpha-(1->3)-D-Glc-beta-(1->4)-D-Glc-alpha-1-diphospho-ditrans,octacis-undecaprenol

The enzyme is involved in the biosynthesis of the exopolysaccharide xanthan.

References

External links 
 

EC 2.4.1